The following is a list of massacres that have occurred in the Dominican Republic (numbers may be approximate):

References

External links

Dominican Republic
Massacres

Massacres